Qserv Ltd. specialised in oil-well services operations, including slickline, coiled tubing and pumping services. In July 2008, the company was acquired by Aker Solutions and it was acquired by EQT Partners in 2013.

The company was named after its focus of "Quality Service".

History
The company was founded in November 2001 by Tommy Dreelan.

In 2004, the company was awarded a contract by ExxonMobil.

In March 2005, it was awarded a 5-year well service contract by BP.

In 2005, for the 3rd year in a row, the company won the International Safety Award from the British Safety Council.

In July 2006, it acquired the coiled-tubing unit of Weatherford International.

In December 2006, it acquired the wireline and well-service division of KCA DEUTAG.

In July 2008, the company was acquired by Aker Solutions for $198 million and was renamed Aker Qserv.

In 2013, Aker Solutions sold its entire well-intervention division, including Qserv, to EQT Partners for £400 million.

References

2001 establishments in Scotland
2008 disestablishments in Scotland
2008 mergers and acquisitions
Companies established in 2001
Defunct energy companies of the United Kingdom